Morocco-Egypt relations refers to the bilateral relations between the kingdom of Morocco and the Arab Republic of Egypt.
Since independence, the two nations have maintained warm relations.  Both countries are members of the African Union, the Arab League, GAFTA, WTO, the Non-Aligned Movement, the Organisation of Islamic Cooperation, the Council of Arab Economic Unity and the UN.

Political support
Egypt has repeatedly reiterated its support for Morocco's territorial integrity. "Egypt has always backed Morocco's efforts to perfect its territorial integrity," Egyptian deputy minister of foreign affairs, Jamal-Eddine Bayoumi told Moroccan daily Al-Mounaataf. Bayoumi also stressed the need for Morocco and Egypt to consolidate trade relations among Arab states.

Economic cooperation
Morocco and Egypt are both signers of the Agadir Agreement for the Establishment of a Free Trade Zone between the Arabic Mediterranean Nations, signed in Rabat, Morocco on 25 February 2004. The agreement aimed at establishing a free trade area between Jordan, Tunisia, Egypt and Morocco and it was seen as a possible first step in the establishment of the Euro-Mediterranean free trade area as envisaged in the Barcelona Process. They are also founding members of GAFTA, a pact made by the Arab League to achieve a complete Arab economic bloc that can compete internationally.

See also
Arab League
Arab Maghreb Union
Western Sahara War

References